The Sand, also titled Blood Sand, is a 2015 American monster movie directed by Isaac Gabaeff and starring Brooke Butler, Meagan Holder and Mitchel Musso. At least one version of the opening credits reads "Killer Beach," but the closing credits give the movie title as "The Sand."

Plot

A group of friends are having a party at the beach. A girl named Heather is recording the party when two of the boys, Vance and Gilbert, find a large ball covered in a strange gooey substance. All the teenagers agree to put their mobile phones in the trunk of a car in an effort to ensure that no one will post compromising pictures or videos online.

The next morning, two of the friends, Kaylee and Mitch, wake up on the lifeguard shack. Kaylee's boyfriend, Jonah, awakens in a nearby convertible next to a girl named Chanda, along with Vance and his girlfriend, Ronnie. Gilbert wakes up, stuck from the waist down in a trash barrel, having been put there as a prank after passing out. A girl named Marsha wakes up, topless, having fallen asleep on top of a picnic table. The rest of the teenagers, including Heather, are nowhere to be found; there are, instead, a bunch of empty sleeping bags in their places.

Marsha accuses Heather of having stolen her top; she leaves the picnic table to find her. Kaylee, witnessing a bird suddenly getting sucked into the sand, tries to warn her, but Marsha doesn't listen and is immediately immobilized by something hidden underneath the beach. Vance attempts to help her, but he falls and has his face eaten off when he touches the sand, and he and Marsha are pulled into the ground. Jonah concludes that the cracked ball from last night must have been an egg, and whatever hatched from it has burrowed under the sand and has wiped out everyone, including Vance, Heather, and Marsha.

The group cannot call for help, as their phones are locked in the car, and the car's battery is dead from their having left the headlights on all night. After some experimenting to determine the creature's reach, Jonah uses two surfboards as a bridge to reach the picnic table. He makes it to the table, but not before the creature has slashed his stomach, leaving a painful wound that starts seeping pus. He notes, though, that the creature won't go near the ashes of the previous night's bonfire, indicating that it hates fire. Ronnie and Chanda attempt to retrieve the phones from the car, but Ronnie gets her fingers crushed under the trunk's lid.

A beach patrolman drives onto the beach. The group warns him, then are shocked to see him walk across the sand unharmed, protected by his boots. The patrolman assumes the group is on drugs and taunts them, but when he drops his keys and tries to retrieve them, the buried creature attacks him. He temporarily fights it off using his pepper spray, but the monster eventually consumes him. Kaylee manages to retrieve his pepper spray, which gives Mitch the idea to reach the truck by putting his flip-flops on and wrapping his feet with towels soaked in pepper spray. Chanda throws him towels from the car, but when Mitch attempts to catch the second towel, the banister breaks and he falls onto the sand, where the creature kills and consumes him.

Taking charge, Kaylee frees Ronnie's fingers from the car trunk, then has Chanda use the broken pieces of the boardwalk as a bridge to get to Jonah on the picnic table. Meanwhile, Gilbert discovers that he has cut his stomach on the edge of the trash barrel, attracting the creature. Kaylee and Ronnie make their way across the makeshift bridge to Chanda and Jonah. At the last step, Ronnie trips and, despite Kaylee's efforts, she is seized and pulled under. In desperation, Chanda follows through with Mitch's plan and runs across the sand to the truck with pepper-sprayed towels wrapping her feet. The group celebrates for a brief moment, but then Gilbert is pulled down through the bottom of the barrel and devoured. The creature, having grown much larger tentacles, bangs against the patrol car, knocking Chanda unconscious.

At nightfall, Chanda wakes up and finds a self-inflatable raft in the back of the truck. She inflates the raft, and Kaylee and Jonah use it to reach the patrolman's car. However, the ground erupts, knocking Kaylee out of the open door and onto the raft. A huge glowing tentacle shoots out from the ground and assaults her. She manages to get on top of the car and, finding two gas cans on the rear rack, uses them to set one of the tentacles on fire. Kaylee, Chanda, and Jonah lock themselves in the car as the creature's tentacles bash it. Eventually, the attacks stop; in the silence, Kaylee and Chanda notice that Jonah has died from his injuries.

The two girls fall asleep huddled together. In the morning, the girls are woken by a man tapping on the car window. Kaylee and Chanda note, incredulously, that the creature is gone, and walk across the sand together, traumatized, as the man calls for an ambulance. In a closing shot, the creature, revealed as an enormous jellyfish, is seen in the water, headed towards Santa Monica Pier.

Cast
Brooke Butler as Kaylee
Cleo Berry as Gilbert
Dean Geyer as Jonah
Meagan Holder as Chanda
Mitchel Musso as Mitch
Hector David Jr. as Vance
Nikki Leigh as Marsha 
Etalvia Cashin as Heather
Jamie Kennedy as Beach Patrol Alex
Michael Huntsman as Unnamed Man

Home media
The film was released on DVD by Monarch Video on October 13, 2015.

Reception

Critical response for The Sand has been mixed, with criticism of the special effects.

Mike Wilson from Bloody Disgusting gave the film a negative review, stating that while the film's admittedly cheap special effects added a certain charm, and the film's death scenes were disturbing and well-executed; Wilson criticized the film's performances, dialogue, and the film's runtime. Kim Newman wrote in his review of the film, "Though well-acted, smartly-written and nicely directed by Isaac Gabaeff to ratchet up the tension, The Sand suffers from hit-or-miss CGI effects – even the lo-tech practical monster/gore effects of vintage Corman c Attack of the Giant Leeches or Frank Henenlotter in his Basket Case-Brain Damage mode would play better than the glitchy, cartoony pixel-jumble that passes for a monster here". Naila Scargill from Exquisite Terror gave the film a negative review, calling it "arduous", and criticized the lack of screen time of the film's monster, as well as the film's unlikable characters, and special effects. Matt Boiselle from Dread Central awarded the film two out of five stars, writing, "The Sand could be good for a midnight watch where goofiness is happily embraced and the need for creature fun is welcome; however, once the sun comes up, it's best to find a lot of shade from this solar disaster".

Alternately, Michael Therkelsen from Horror Society rated the film a score of eight out of ten, calling it "a campy good time", while also noting the film's cheap special effects didn't fit with the rest of the film. Jennie Kermode of Eye for Film gave the film three and a half out of five stars, commending the film's quick pacing, and likable characters, writing, "It takes skill to make a cheesy creature feature well. The Sand is much smarter than it looks on the surface. Give it time and it will pull you in." Kat Hughes from The Hollywood News offered the film similar praise, writing, "The Sand takes a silly idea and somehow makes it work, helped greatly by the fact that it has got buckets of charm".

See also
Blood Beach - a 1981 film with a similar premise

References

External links

2015 horror films
2015 independent films
2010s monster movies
2010s science fiction horror films
American independent films
American monster movies
American science fiction horror films
Films shot in California
Films set on beaches
2010s English-language films
2010s American films